Michael Dong is a champion professional slalom skateboarder from Bothell, Washington, United States.  Dong was ranked #5 in the world in 2005 and holds the 2003, 2004, and 2005 World Cyber Slalom titles.

Dong began skateboarding in 1975.  Early skating highlights include: 1979 Capitol Lakefair Skateboard Contest, Olympia, Washington, 14-year-old age group: 1st pool riding, 1st freestyle, 1st cross-country. In 2002, Dong re-entered competitive skateboarding after a 22-year absence, competing in the San Francisco Battle by the Bay.  He quickly moved from the amateur ranks to professional. In 2003, he was ranked #5 in the world in slalom skateboarding, maintaining the #5 ranking in 2004 and 2005. He has established himself as the #1 cyber slalom skateboarder in the world. Dong is a member of the RoeRacing Slalom Skateboard Team.

2005 Results 
 Slalom Week 2005 World Championships (Morro Bay, California) – 17 September 2005
 Tight Slalom - 3rd Place
 Slalom – 4th Place
 European Championships (Stockholm, Sweden) - July 15, 2005: Cyber Slalom Cup - 1st Place
 3dm Seismic West Coast Championships (Hood River, Oregon) – Tight Slalom – 1st Place –  9 July 2005
 “Bro, Your Dad’s a Martian” (Bush's Pasture Park Soap Box Derby Hill, Salem,  Oregon) – Tight Slalom (dual lane) – 1st Place – 19 June 2005
 Paris World Cup (Paris, France) - May 14, 2005: Tight Straight Slalom - 2nd Place
 Red Clay Cup  (Athens, Georgia) – Slalom – 3rd Place – 30 April 2005

Cyber Slalom
As of 2018, Dong still held the world record for the Cyber Slalom, with a time of 7.96sec, set in Beaverton, Oregon in September 2008.

References

External links 
Slalom Skateboarding World Rankings
International Skateboard Slalom Association (ISSA)
North California Downhill Skateboarding Association (NCDSA)

American skateboarders
Living people
People from Bothell, Washington
Year of birth missing (living people)